Lorenzo Trotti (1633 – 30 September 1700) was a Roman Catholic prelate who served as Archbishop (Personal Title) of Pavia (1672–1700), Apostolic Nuncio to Venice (1668–1671), Apostolic Nuncio to Florence (1666–1668), and Titular Archbishop of Carthage (1666–1672).

Biography
Lorenzo Trotti was born in Alessandria, Italy in 1633.
On 11 October 1666, he was appointed during the papacy of Pope Alexander VII as Titular Archbishop of Cartagine.
On 24 October 1666, he was consecrated bishop by Benedetto Odescalchi, Cardinal-Priest of Sant'Onofrio. 
On 20 November 1666, he was appointed during the papacy of Pope Alexander VII as Apostolic Nuncio to Florence; he resigned on 25 April 1668.
On 10 April 1668, he was appointed during the papacy of Pope Clement IX as Apostolic Nuncio to Venice; he resigned in April 1671.
On 12 December 1672, he was appointed during the papacy of Pope Clement X as Archbishop (Personal Title) of Pavia.
He served as Bishop of Pavia until his death on 30 September 1700.

Episcopal succession
While bishop, he was the principal co-consecrator of:

References

External links and additional sources
 (for Chronology of Bishops) 
 (for Chronology of Bishops)  
 (for Chronology of Bishops)  
 (for Chronology of Bishops)  

17th-century Italian Roman Catholic archbishops
Bishops appointed by Pope Alexander VII
Bishops appointed by Pope Clement IX
Bishops appointed by Pope Clement X
1633 births
1700 deaths
People from Alessandria
Apostolic Nuncios to the Republic of Venice
Apostolic Nuncios to the Republic of Florence